is a Japanese tokusatsu drama series produced by Tsuburaya Productions. As the 33rd entry to the Ultra Series and the third in the Reiwa era, the show presents itself as a modern retelling of Ultraman Tiga, while also celebrating its 25th anniversary. It premiered on TV Tokyo on July 10, 2021.

Synopsis

Ultraman Trigger follows the story of Martian botanist Kengo Manaka, who is bonded to the titular Ultra when the three Giants of Darkness are resurrected from their ancient seal to claim the Eternity Core and threaten the safety of the universe. Following his fight with Golba and Carmeara on Mars, Kengo is drafted into the defense team GUTS-Select on Earth, where he continues to defend mankind from both the forces of evil and daily monster attacks while at the same time trying to protect Yuna, whose status as Yuzare's descendant makes her an open target to their enemies. As the story progresses, Kengo and his friends learn of Trigger's past association with the Giants of Darkness and eventually find themselves responsible for the Ultra's turn to light after a time travel incident into the past. While Trigger gains a portion of Eternity Core to further strengthen himself, the Ultra's dark energy bonds with the Lishurian treasure hunter Ignis, who uses its power as part of his vendetta against Hudram for the loss of his home planet.

Upon learning of Kengo's involvement in the past, the Giants of Darkness started to lose their unity as each member had their interests hindering their original goal of obtaining the Eternity Core. Hudram's attempt at breaking away from Carmeara resulted in his death by Ignis/Trigger Dark, while Darrgon was brainwashed against his will after he begins to acknowledge mankind's worth, forcing him to be given mercy kill to end his suffering. With her former comrades' essence absorbed and Yuna being captured, Carmeara mutated herself into the monster Megalothor once establishing a contract with the Eternity Core, dooming both the Earth and the universe itself. In the last resort tactic, Trigger briefly reabsorbed his darker half to fight on par with the destroyer and put an end to Carmeara's reign of terror. At the end of the series, Kengo/Trigger merges with the Eternity Core to stabilize its energy and save the universe from a second Big Bang, his friends hoping to see him again one day.

Production and casting
Ultraman Trigger was announced by Tsuburaya Productions on April 15, 2021. According to director Koichi Sakamoto, the series is intended to be Ultraman Tiga recreated in the modern day interpretation for the current generation of audience to enjoy, in addition to those grew up watching Tiga. Additional cast members were announced in June 10 during an online event that introduces the main cast members, in addition to the voice actors. Electronic company Mirai-Labo announced their collaboration in the series.

Sakamoto included various situations alluding to the real life, such as GUTS Falcon being remote controlled akin to unmanned aerial vehicle and Kengo's habit of cheering others with his smile to provide comfort to the children in a similar sense to his previous work in Kamen Rider Fourze.

Remembering that Ultraman Tiga delivered a huge impact to the audience in 1996 to 1997, Sakamoto aims to reinvoke the same element (in addition to those of Ultraman Dyna and Gaia from the TDG trilogy series) into Trigger while maintaining both shows as separate entities. The titular hero, Ultraman Trigger, had his design and Type Change forms proposed by Sakamoto to be based on American comic book superheroes, having observed their changes in costumes over the years. Trigger's weapon, the Circle Arms, is an addition to the series that takes cues from combat weapons of Ultra Warriors of New Generation Heroes instalments and will also serve as a crucial key item in the future.

Director Masayoshi Takesue confirms Trigger to be the ninth entry in  series lineup since Ultraman Ginga, despite its little relation to its predecessors.

Episodes

Spin-off programs

Marlu-Dex
 is a Tsuburaya Imagination-exclusive spin-off program hosted by the Alien Metron Marluru, who provides explanations and hindsight to the appearing Ultra Heroes, Kaiju and object of interest in Ultraman Trigger: New Generation Tiga.

Secret Origins of the Nursedessei: The Struggle of Special Section 3
 is the second Tsuburaya Imagination-exclusive spin-off program serving as a prequel to Ultraman Trigger: New Generation Tiga. Before she was enlisted in the GUTS-Select, Marluru was a member of TPU's .

GUTS-SELECT

Galaxy Rescue Force Voice Drama
 is a spin-off that is set to air in Tsuburaya Production's YouTube channel while coinciding with the premier of Ultraman Trigger: New Generation Tiga. It follows the exploits of Galaxy Rescue Force members during their adventures.

The main cast also includes Wataru Komada and  reprising their roles as Ultraman Ribut and Sora respectively from Ultra Galaxy Fight miniseries.

Ultra Galaxy Fight: The Destined Crossroad

 is the third instalment of the Ultra Galaxy Fight miniseries that is set to air in 2022. Absolutians Tartarus and Diavolo, as well as Ultraman Ribut, will appear in Trigger after the events of The Destined Crossroad.

Ultraman Trigger: Episode Z

 is a film released on Tsuburaya Imagination and in Japanese theaters on March 18, 2022.

Cast
/: 
, : 
: 
: 
: 
: 
/: 
: 
: M・A・O
: 
: 
: 
GUTS Sparklence and GUTS Hyper Keys announcements, narrator (0, SP):

Guest cast

: 
: 
: 
: 
: 
: 
Ribut's human form (14, 15): 
: 
: 
:

Songs
Opening theme
"Trigger"
Lyrics, Composition, & Arrangement: R・O・N
Artist: 
Episodes: 1-13 (Verse 1), 14-24 (Verse 2)
In episode 25, this song is used as an insert song.

Ending themes

Arrangement: 
Lyrics, Composition, & Artist: ChouCho
Episodes: 1-13

Lyrics: 
Composition & Arrangement: 
Artist: Kengo Manaka, Yuna Shizuma, & Akito Hijiri (Raiga Terasaka, Runa Toyoda, & Shunya Kaneko)
Episodes: 14, 16-25

Lyrics: 
Composition & Arrangement: AstroNoteS
Artist: Ribut (Shimba Tsuchiya)
Episodes: 15

International broadcast
In Hong Kong, this series aired on ViuTV on March 26, 2022. In Philippines, this series will be air on GMA Network in 2023.

See also
Ultra Series – Complete list of official Ultraman-related shows.

Notes

References

Bibliography

External links
Ultraman Trigger: New Generation Tiga at Tsuburaya Productions 
Ultraman Trigger: New Generation Tiga at TV Tokyo 

2021 Japanese television series debuts
Ultra television series
TV Tokyo original programming